Gabrielona nepeanensis is a species of small sea snail with calcareous opercula, a marine gastropod mollusk in the family Phasianellidae, the pheasant snails.

Description
The size of the shell varies between 0.8 mm and 2 mm.

Distribution
This marine species occurs off Victoria, South Australia and Tasmania

References

 Iredale, T. & McMichael, D.F. (1962). A reference list of the marine Mollusca of New South Wales. Memoirs of the Australian Museum. 11 
 Robertson, R. (1973). The genus Gabrielona (Phasianellidae) in the Indo-Pacific and West Indies . Indo-Pacific Mollusca. 3 (14)
 Wilson, B. (1993).  Australian Marine Shells. Prosobranch Gastropods. Kallaroo, WA : Odyssey Publishing. Vol.1 1st Edn

External links
 To Biodiversity Heritage Library (2 publications)
 To ITIS
 To World Register of Marine Species
 

Phasianellidae
Gastropods described in 1908